Barylypa is a genus of parasitoid wasps belonging to the family Ichneumonidae.

The species of this genus are found in Europe and Northern America.

Species:
 Barylypa amabilis (Tosquinet, 1900) 
 Barylypa andalusiaca (Strobl, 1904)

References

Ichneumonidae
Ichneumonidae genera